This is a list of Roman bridges. The Romans were the world's first major bridge builders. The following list constitutes an attempt to list all known surviving remains of Roman bridges.

A Roman bridge in the sense of this article includes any of these features:
Roman arches
Roman pillars
Roman foundations
Roman abutments
Roman roadway
Roman cutwaters

Also listed are bridges which feature substantially Roman material (spolia), as long as the later bridge is erected on the site of a Roman precursor. Finally, incidences where only inscriptions lay testimony to a former Roman bridge are also included.

In the following, bridges are classified either according to their material or their function. Most data not otherwise marked come from O’Connor's Roman Bridges, which lists 330 stone bridges for traffic, 34 timber bridges and 54 aqueduct bridges. An even larger compilation of more than 900 Roman bridges (as of 2011) is offered by the Italian scholar Galliazzo, who is used here only selectively.

Note: the table columns are sortable by clicking the header, e.g. for country of origin, etc.

Note on classification 
Bridges are particularly difficult to classify as they, more than other structures, are subject to wear, on account of war and the impact of natural elements. The constant need for repairs through the ages has often turned bridges into hybrid structures, making it often difficult or nearly impossible to determine the exact date and origin of individual parts of a bridge. Thus, the majority of bridges listed below can be assumed to include medieval or (early) modern modifications, replacements or extensions, to a small or large extent.

Masonry road bridges 
The following table lists road bridges made out of stone or brick. The vast majority features arches, although stone deck slabs were also known. Bridges' spans and height abbreviations: S = small, M = middle, L = large.

Timber and stone pillar bridges 
A timber bridge is a structure composed wholly out of wood, while a stone pillar bridge features a wooden superstructure resting on stone pillars. Strictly speaking, many bridges of the second type should be rather called "concrete pillar bridges", as the Romans preferably used opus caementicium for constructing their bridge piers (stone was confined in these cases to covering). Both types, timber bridges and stone respectively concrete pillar bridges, are listed here in the same category as historically, with the consolidation of Roman power in the newly conquered provinces, wooden bridges often gave way to solid pillar bridges.

Pontoon bridges 
As an alternative to ferry services, the Roman army often made use of pontoon bridges, along with timber structures, for river crossings. They usually consisted of boats lashed together, with the bows pointing towards the current. Permanent bridges of boats were also commonly set up for civilian traffic.

Aqueduct bridges

See also 
Record-holding bridges in antiquity
List of Roman sites in Spain
General overview
Roman architecture
Roman engineering
Roman military engineering
Roman technology
Other Roman building structures
Roman aqueduct
Roman roads

References

Sources 
Main source

Other sources

Further reading 
Fernández Casado, C.: Historia del puente en España. Puentes Romanos, Instituto Eduardo Torroja, Madrid 1980

External links 

Vici.org category 'brige' - Overview and map ofRoman Bridges
Traianus – Technical investigation of Roman public works
600 Roman Aqueducts – with 40 described in detail
Roman bridges in Portugal – pictures and description 
Lacus Curtius – Roman Bridges
Ancient Tiber River Bridges and the Development of Rome

 
 
Bridges
Roman bridges

.